Justin Young may refer to:

Justin Young (singer, born 1978), American singer
Justin Young (singer, born 1987), English singer, lead singer in The Vaccines
Justin Robert Young (born 1983), podcaster, journalist, comedian and writer
Justin Young (basketball), professional basketball player for Thang Long Warriors